Family Policy Alliance (FPA), formerly CitizenLink and Focus on the Family Action, is an American conservative Christian organization that acts as the lobbying arm of Focus on the Family at the level of state government politics. It is an umbrella organization for an "alliance" of state organizations known as Family Policy Councils which are state-level Focus on the Family affiliates.

The stated mission of Family Policy Alliance is "to advance biblical citizenship, equip and elect statesmen, promote policy and serve an effective alliance, all committed to a common vision". The organization opposes and advocates against same-sex marriage,
transgender rights,
legal abortion, sexual consent education,
marijuana decriminalization,
and the Equal Rights Amendment. FPA supports Reaganomics and traditional gender roles. It considers LGBT rights to be a dangerous "LGBT agenda."

As an organization with 501(c)(4) tax status, FPA faces fewer political lobbying restrictions than its affiliate Focus on the Family. FPA lobbying includes "rigorous training by experienced Christian legislative leaders" for politicians who align with the organization's conservative priorities. The organization maintains a 501(c)(3) called Family Policy Foundation.

It was founded in 2004 by James Dobson and operates from Focus on the Family headquarters in Colorado Springs.

History

The alliance of lobbying groups that FPA currently coordinates was built by James Dobson, a Southern California psychologist and evangelical Christian radio broadcaster, beginning in the 1980s. Dobson is the founder of Focus on the Family, which described the alliance-building as a "behind-the-scenes" program to affect legislation and culture without appearing to be coordinated. According to The United Methodist Reporter members were urged to keep the existence of the alliance a secret so that they would appear to be diversity of different groups, rather than a coordinated effort. The members of this alliance became known as Family Policy Councils.

In the 1980s and 1990s, Focus on the Family and its state-level Family Policy Councils were associated with highly-visible culture wars, including strong opposition to legal abortion and same-sex marriage. The alliance was unable to maintain its secrecy and became more widely known in the 1990s. The organization Family Policy Alliance has operated since 2004, coordinating the state Family Policy Council organizations. It shares Focus on the Family's Colorado Springs headquarters building.

Partnership with Women's Liberation Front

In 2017, FPA filed an amicus brief jointly with Women's Liberation Front, a trans-exclusionary radical feminist organization, to the US Supreme Court. The brief, in opposition to a lower court ruling for a transgender student, stated "pro-family Christians and radical feminists may not agree about much, but they agree that redefining "sex" to mean "gender identity" is a truly fundamental shift in American law and society." The head of FPA Kansas called this partnership "co-belligerence with strange bedfellows."

Georgia elections

At the time of the Trump–Raffensperger phone call, FPA of Georgia sent a fundraising email in support of Trump's attempts to overturn the results of the US presidential election. The group's executive director, Cole Muzio, expressed concern that Georgia is become more liberal and that the church in Georgia is become weaker. Muzio says that these demographic trends are a form of "cheating" in elections, requiring FPA to respond by advocating for election laws favoring conservative Christians.

Journalist Sarah Posner considers this action by FPA to be part of a larger trend in which the American Christian right embraces voter suppression techniques.

Criticism

According to its website, critics of Family Policy Alliance refer to it as a hate group.

Elisa Rae Shupe, a former supporter of FPA and speaker at their Statesmen Academy, says that the goal of FPA is "to inflict maximum harm" on transgender people. Shupe regrets providing training to lawmakers on how cause harm. She feels that the FPA exploited her mental illness when they recruited her as a speaker.

State allies

Family Policy Alliance maintains associations with state-based family policy councils in 40 US states. Each of these partners lobbies for conservative policy at the state government level. Allies include:
Alabama Policy Institute
Center for Arizona Policy
Citizens for Community Values in Ohio
Colorado Family Action
Cornerstone Policy Research in New Hampshire
Family Policy Alliance of Kansas
Frontline Policy Council, formerly FPA of Georgia
Idaho Family Policy Center
Indiana Family Institute
Louisiana Family Forum
Minnesota Family Council
Nebraska Family Alliance
New Yorker's Family Research Foundation
Texas Values, the lobbying arm of First Liberty Institute
The Family Leader in Iowa
Wisconsin Family Council

See also

Christian right

References

External links
 Official website

Focus on the Family
Christian organizations established in 2004
American Christian political organizations